Dueling Network (commonly abbreviated DN) was an online, unofficial Adobe Flash–based simulation of the Yu-Gi-Oh! Trading Card Game (TCG). It was created by Christopher Salvarani on March 3, 2006 and officially released on May 17, 2011. Its popularity grew quickly and it had gained more than four million registered users. The site was run by in-game volunteer administrators and moderators. At its peak, its server allowed for more than 10,000 players to be online at the same time.

Dueling Network started on May 8, 2011 and officially released on May 17, 2011. After the release, the site's popularity grew quickly, and as of 2013, had acquired more than three million registered users. The site provided users with various in-game messaging systems. From the main menu, players were able to access the Duel Room, construct Decks, check players' rankings and profiles, edit their own profiles and change their account passwords. The game was intended to be a simulation of the real-life card game and as such, was set to be played manually with little in-game automation. It followed official Konami policy as closely as possible.

Database and gameplay 

Dueling Network updated its database with all available in Yu-Gi-Oh! as soon as they reached their official release date. All available cards were free-to-play. The game followed all official TCG rules. It was possible to play in Advanced (Rated), Advanced (Unrated), Traditional (Unrated), and Unlimited (Unrated). To play in these sections, players were able to access the Duel Room and choose the section they want to play in with a Deck that met the standards of that section.

Advanced (Rated) 
Advanced (Rated) followed the TCG Forbidden/Limited card list. Both TCG and Yu-Gi-Oh! Official Card Game cards were allowed, (though the latter was only allowed in a specific form of rated for these additional OCG cards). Players were matched through a system called the DN Pool that randomly paired players who had similar skill levels. Both players gained or lost rating points based on the outcome of the duel. The Advanced (Rated) section was divided into single duels and matches (winner 2 out of 3).

For rating calculation, Dueling Network used the formula , where  was the scaling factor for rating adjustments,  represented the result of the game (1 for a win, 0.5 for a draw, 0 for a loss), and  represented the expected result of the game, determined by the relative ratings of the players (close to 1 for almost certain victory, close to 0 for almost certain loss, 0.5 for even match-up).

Rankings 
The Rankings section was the leader board of Dueling Network; it showed singles or matches. It kept track of ratings, (for a format only), wins, and experience points of DN users, regardless of the form of rated selected, as opposed to making a separate list for the differing cardpools.

Advanced (Unrated) 
Advanced (Unrated) followed the TCG Forbidden/Limited card list, but included cards legal only in the OCG (marked as OCG cards in deck construction) or even unreleased cards for the TCG/OCG, (marked by a yellow oval with a slash in deck construction.) Players were paired up by hosting matches or singles in the Duel Room. A player's rating did not change based on the outcome of unrated singles or matches. A leader board for this section did not exist.

Traditional (Unrated) 
Traditional (Unrated) followed the TCG Traditional card list while maintaining the same additions as the advanced unrated section. All of the Forbidden cards were Limited. A leader board for this section did not exist.

Unlimited (Unrated) 

Unlimited (Unrated) allowed the player to have three of each card in their deck, regardless of the Forbidden/Limited card list. A leader board for this section did not exist.

Administrators 
Administrators dealt with problems in which players found themselves, such as in-game ruling questions, glitches, AFK, spam, cheating, and harassment. There were three types of DN administrators, who could be identified by the color of their usernames in chat boxes: regular (in-game) administrators, whose names were green; senior administrators, whose names were gray; and head administrators, whose names were yellow. They all had duties to moderate the DN public chat and to answer calls made by users to solve in-game issues. All administrators had the ability to penalize DN users who broke the rules described in the DN Rules and Punishments Table. Users were able to become administrators through the DN Administrator Exam.

Dueling Network Forum 

The Dueling Network Forum (DNF) was the official forum of Dueling Network. The forum had sections directly and indirectly associated with the TCG and DN. It contained topics including: card trading, Yu-Gi-Oh! discussions, other TCG discussions, Yu-Gi-Oh! rulings, DN tournaments, and others. Forums were run by volunteer moderators and administrators. DNF had gathered more than 100,000 registered members since its launch in 2011. On July 5, 2016, the date of the Dueling Network shutdown, the Forum was still active. The Forum was shut down indefinitely the next day. By July 8, it had been reinstated.

Shutdown 
On July 5, 2016, the Dueling Network website was taken offline for "legal reasons... until further notice". The notice posted on the homepage indicated that the third party responsible was not Konami, but rather "another authorized party". No further information was offered, but fans speculate that Nihon Ad Systems (NAS) was the third party that ordered the shutdown, as they sent a cease and desist order for the removal of their intellectual property (card images, sleeves, characters) from DN on March 24, 2016. Dueling Network Forums planned to merge with The Organization forums, but the staff reconsidered. A security breach compromised 6.5 million e-mail addresses and passwords. A former Dueling Network administrator made a replacement called Dueling Book.

References

External links 
 Dueling Network
 Forum

2006 video games
Browser games
Digital collectible card games
Flash games
Massively multiplayer online games
Yu-Gi-Oh! video games
Inactive massively multiplayer online games
Video games developed in the United States